Eugène Bléry (1805–1887), was a French engraver.

He was born in Fontainebleau and became the teacher of Charles Méryon.

He died in Paris.

References

External links
Eugène Bléry on Artnet

1805 births
1887 deaths
19th-century French engravers
19th-century French male artists
People from Fontainebleau
Chevaliers of the Légion d'honneur